Balkan Inc. was a Slovenian television series. It was broadcast in 2006.

Cast 
 Ivo Ban as Lord
 Ivan Brkić as Momo Desnica
 Aleksandar Cvjetković as Čens
 Nina Ivanič as Monika
 Sven Šestak as Žuti
 Nives Ivanković as Duda
 Tina Gorenjak as Urška
 Goran Grgić as Žac Lisjak
 Damir Markovina as Boško
 Boris Mihalj as Primož
 Mustafa Nadarević as Bero
 Stjepan Perić as Diler
 Matija Vastl as Bernard
 Sanja Vejnović as Renata Lisjak
 Mladen Vulić as Brko
 Branko Završan as Boss
 Petar Cvirn as Kreso Lisjak

Slovenian television series
2006 Slovenian television series debuts
2006 Slovenian television series endings
2000s Slovenian television series
Television shows filmed in Serbia
Pop (Slovenian TV channel) original programming